Roller Hollow is a valley in Taney County in the U.S. state of Missouri.

Roller Hollow has the name of the local Roller family.

References

Valleys of Taney County, Missouri
Valleys of Missouri